Sandown High School, Johannesburg is a school in Johannesburg, Sandton. Sandown High is situated on the corner of Rivonia and Grayston drive.

Notable alumni
 Refiloe Mpakanyane - Radio presenter, journalist

External links
Facebook
Google Maps: satellite
Old pupils: list of ex-students
Sandton Chronicle

Schools in Johannesburg